Events from the year 1880 in Bolivia.

Incumbents
President: Narciso Campero

Events
March 22 - Battle of Los Ángeles
May 26 - Battle of Tacna

Births

Deaths

 
1880s in Bolivia